Dioscorea rimbachii is a species in the family Dioscoreaceae. It is endemic to Ecuador, in which it grows from altitudes of 2,000 to 4,000 meters.

References

rimbachii